Kevin Eugene Lockett (born September 8, 1974) is a former American football wide receiver and punt returner in the National Football League for the Kansas City Chiefs, Washington Redskins, Jacksonville Jaguars and New York Jets. He played college football at Kansas State University where he was a football and Academic All-American.  He went to high school at Booker T. Washington High School in Tulsa.

College
Lockett broke the school career touchdown receptions record in the same game that head coach Bill Snyder set the record for most career wins by a Kansas State football coach on September 30, 1995 for the Kansas State Wildcats. Prior to the formation of the Big 12 Conference in 1996, the Kansas State Wildcats competed in the Big Eight Conference. As a member of the 1996 Wildcats, he led the Big 12 Conference in receptions per game. He was a 1996 All-Big 12 Conference first-team wide receiver. He was a 1996 first-team Academic All-Big 12 selection. On special teams, he made first blocked kick in Big 12 Conference history on August 31, 1996.

He established the following Kansas State school records: career receptions (217, 1993–96), career receiving yards (3032, 1993–96) - broken 1998 by Tyler Lockett, career receiving touchdowns (26, 1993–96), single-game receptions by a freshman (8, 11/20/93), single-season receiving yards by a freshman (770, 1998) - broken 1998 by Aaron Lockett, single-season receptions by a freshman (50, 1993), career 100-yard receiving games (9, 1993–96)-broken 2000 by Quincy Morgan, single-season receptions (72, 1996) - broken 1998 by Darnell McDonald, and single-season receiving touchdowns (13, 1995) - broken 2000 by Morgan. He led Kansas State in the following statistics, receptions (1993, 50; 1995, 56; 1996, 72), receiving yards (1993, 770; 1994, 583; 1995, 797; 1996, 882), and scoring (78, 1995).  He also earned Academic All-America distinction in 1995 and 1996.

Professional career

Kansas City Chiefs
The Kansas City Chiefs selected Lockett in the second round of the 1997 NFL Draft with the 47th overall selection. As a rookie, his only reception came in a November 23, 1997 contest against Seattle for the Chiefs who went 13–3.  This was the only playoff team that he played for.  In 1998, he caught 19 passes for 281 yards, followed by the best year of his career with 34 receptions for 426 yards and two touchdowns for the 1999 Chiefs, and then 33 receptions for 422 yards and two touchdowns for the 2000 Chiefs. In week 4 of the 2000 NFL season, he made a key third down reception on the clinching drive of the game as Elvis Grbac engineered an 8-play 80-yard drive to earn a 23–22 victory over Denver. His highest single-game yardage total came in week 9 of the 2000 season when he totaled 77 yards, including a first half touchdown against Seattle. That season, he tallied 7 receptions the following week for 57 yards and then he became the regular punt returner for the rest of the season, totaling 24 returns in the final 7 games.

Washington Redskins
Following the 2000 season, he signed a two-year contract with the Washington Redskins. Although he was the third receiver with the Redskins for the 2001 season, he was considered a receiver who demanded coverage from one of the opposition's top defenders. His production slipped in the 2001 season, only recording 22 receptions for 293 yards with zero touchdowns, but he completed his only pass attempt for a 31-yard touchdown to Derrius Thompson after receiving a backwards pass from Tony Banks. On November 1, he was released by the Redskins after tallying 11 receptions (including two touchdowns) for 129 yards, and a second touchdown pass making him two-for-two.

Jacksonville Jaguars
Lockett signed with the Jacksonville Jaguars two days after his release from the Redskins, and had five receptions (including two touchdowns) in his seven games for the team. Although less productive in terms of yards and receptions, the 2002 NFL season gave Lockett his career-high 4 touchdown receptions (and a touchdown pass). He re-signed with Jacksonville in the spring of 2003, but did not play any games for the Jaguars.

New York Jets
Lockett was signed by the New York Jets in mid-November. Lockett spent four weeks on the practice squad before being activated for the final three games in which he made 5 receptions for 76 yards.

Personal life
His son Tyler is a wide receiver for the Seattle Seahawks. Another son, Sterling was offered a scholarship to Kansas State for their 2022 recruitment class, and announced his commitment on January 1, 2021. His younger brother Aaron played for the Canadian Football League for three seasons.

Notes

See also
Kansas State Wildcats football statistical leaders

American football wide receivers
Booker T. Washington High School (Tulsa, Oklahoma) alumni
Kansas State Wildcats football players
Kansas City Chiefs players
Washington Redskins players
Jacksonville Jaguars players
New York Jets players
Players of American football from Oklahoma
Sportspeople from Tulsa, Oklahoma
1974 births
Living people